Carl Nielsen's Concerto for Violin and orchestra, op. 33 [D.F.61] was written for Hungarian violinist Dr. Emil Telmányi, Nielsen's son-in-law, in 1911. Unusually, the concerto has two movements, both opening with a slower prelude.

Background

The Concerto for Violin and Orchestra, Opus 33, was not an easy assignment for Nielsen. He began writing it in the summer of 1911 in Bergen, Norway, where he was spending some time at the invitation of Nina Grieg. It progressed with some difficulty as Nielsen, now back in his native Denmark, commented that the concerto "has to be good music, and yet always make allowances for the activity of the solo instrument in the best light, that is rich in content, popular and dazzling without becoming superficial." In fact, he did not complete it until mid-December.

Reception

The first performance followed on 28 February 1912, the same night as the first performance of Nielsen's 3rd Symphony. Carl Nielsen himself conducted the Royal Danish Orchestra at the Odd Fellows Mansion in Copenhagen with Peder Møller, Nielsen's preferred virtuoso, as soloist. Nielsen spoke of the "great enthusiasm" with which the concerto was received but in fact the press commented above all on the masterly performance of Møller. Robert Henriques, in his extremely positive review, noted: “The Violin Concerto is a very significant work which will gain every time it is heard, because of course one only gradually becomes aware of all the brilliant details." He saw the concert, which had also included Nielsen's third symphony, as a demonstration of the composer's "rare talent," commenting that he was "on the true road towards the great goals he has set himself." It became something of a landmark for Nielsen who wrote of his overwhelming "Erfolg" (success). The concerto continued to be received with enthusiasm as it was performed on several occasions over the following years, not only in Denmark but also in Gothenburg and Stockholm, always with Møller as soloist.

Music

Unlike Nielsen's later works, the concerto has a distinct, melody-oriented Neo-Classical structure. Unusually, there are two movements. The calm "Praeludium" is followed by a catching tune for the orchestra providing opportunities for tricks by the violin. The long, slow Adagio leads to the final Scherzo which, as Nielsen commented, "renounces everything that might dazzle or impress."

References

Nielsen
Compositions by Carl Nielsen
1911 compositions